Undrugged is a studio album by the Welsh rock band Man and was released in April 2002. The album was recorded in two separate sessions, five years apart and with different line-ups. 
The first recording session is from Lampeter in 1996. The album was then completed in a second session 2001 in Hendrefoilans Studios in Swansea. The Lampeter session was engineered by Al Cotton and the line-up consisted of Micky Jones, Deke Leonard, Martin Ace and Terry Williams. The line-up in 2001 consisted of Micky Jones, Deke Leonard, Martin Ace, Bob Richards and Gareth Thorrington.

Track listing 
 "Scotch Corner" (Micky Jones, Deke Leonard, Morley, Ken Whaley, Terry Williams) – 6:33
 "Babe, I'm Gonna Leave" (Bennett, Anna Bredon, Darling) – 4:33
 "I Always Thought the Walrus Was Protected" (Martin Ace) – 4:09
 "Dream Away" (Leonard) – 6:03
 "Manillo" (Ace) – 4:32
 "Asylum" (Jones) – 5:03
 "Trying to Get to You" (Rose Marie McCoy, Charlie Singleton) – 3:25
 "Listen to Me, Sister" (Leonard) – 2:52
 "Georgia on My Mind" (Hoagy Carmichael, Stuart Gorrell) – 3:44
 "Sail on Sailor" (Tandyn Almer, Ray Kennedy, Van Dyke Parks, Jack Rieley, Brian Wilson) – 3:35
 "Day and Night" (Jones, Leonard, Ken Whaley, Terry Williams) – 4:43

Personnel 
 Micky Jones – guitar
 Deke Leonard – guitar, keyboards, liner notes
 Gareth Thorrington – piano, organ, synthesizer
 Martin Ace – bass
 Terry Williams – drums 
 Bob Richards – drums

References

External links 
 Man - Undrugged (2002) album review by François Couture, credits & releases at AllMusic.com
 Man - Undrugged (2002) album releases & credits at Discogs.com
 Man - Undrugged (2002) album credits & user reviews at ProgArchives.com

2002 albums
Man (band) albums